Godfrey Township is located in Madison County, Illinois, in the United States. As of the 2010 census, its population was 17,982 and it contained 7,708 housing units. Godfrey Township is coterminous with the municipality of Godfrey, Illinois. It is one of two coterminous townships in Madison County and one of seventeen coterminous townships statewide. As of May 20, 2019, Godfrey Township has been dissolved.

History
Godfrey Township is named for Captain Benjamin Godfrey, an early settler and the township's largest landowner.

Geography

Demographics

References

External links
City-data.com
Illinois State Archives

Townships in Madison County, Illinois
Townships in Illinois
Populated places disestablished in 2019